The University of Saint Mary of the Lake (USML) is a private Roman Catholic seminary in Mundelein, Illinois. It is the principal seminary and school of theology for the formation of priests in the Archdiocese of Chicago in Illinois. It was chartered by the Illinois General Assembly in 1844. USML is often referred to by the name of its graduate program, Mundelein Seminary.  Its compound name is University of Saint Mary of the Lake/Mundelein Seminary.

In addition to the seminary, USML offers the Lay Formation Program, Instituto de Liderazgo Pastoral, Diaconate Formation Program, and the Liturgical Institute. Chicago Studies, an academic journal for priests and others in parish ministry, is edited by the university and seminary faculty along with priests of the archdiocese.

History

Seminary program 
William Quarter, the first bishop of Chicago, oversaw the creation in 1844 and early development of the University of Saint Mary of the Lake to ordain more priests to serve the growing diocese. However, due to financial problems, the seminary was forced to close in 1866.

In 1921, Archbishop George Mundelein reopened the facility as Saint Mary Of the Lake Seminary to deal with another priest shortage. He also wanted to create an American clergy to unite all the different Catholic ethnic groups.  In 1926, Saint Mary opened a new campus church, designed by Chicago architect Joseph W. McCarthy.  In 1926, Saint Mary hosted the 28th International Eucharistic Congress.

Pontifical theological faculty 
In September 1929, the Sacred Congregation for Seminaries and Universities in Rome granted a charter to Saint Mary, allowing it to grant pontifical academic degrees. In 1934, this authority became permanent. Saint Mary became the first pontifical university in the United States. Monsignor Reynold Henry Hillenbrand served as rector of St. Mary from 1936 to 1944.

Niles College 
In 1961, Archbishop Albert Meyer opened the Niles College campus in Niles, Illinois as a site for the two-year liberal arts program. The Mundelein campus now hosted second and third year college classes in philosophy, followed by a four-year theology curriculum. Under Cardinal John Cody, the undergraduate program was transferred to Loyola University of Chicago as the Niles College of Loyola University. Saint Mary now became a graduate school of theology only.

In 1971, Saint Mary affiliated with the Association of Theological Schools.  Cardinal Cody, appointed the Reverend Thomas J. Murphy as the fifth rector of Saint Mary on September 15, 1973.

In 1976, Saint Mary inaugurated a Doctor of Ministry degree and celebrated the 50th anniversary of its first ordinations. Archbishop Joseph Bernardin revised the graduate program at Saint Mary to bring it in compliance with the  Program of Priestly Formation, written by the US Conference of Catholic Bishops. In 1986, Bernardin opened the Center for Development in Ministry at St. Mary. The new center provided continuing education for clergy, religious and laity.

University of Saint Mary of the Lake 
In 1986, Saint Mary of the Lake Seminary returned to its original name of the University of Saint Mary of the Lake (USML).  The archdiocese renamed the graduate school  as Mundelein Seminary. In 1996, Mundelein Seminary was visited by members of the Bishops' Committee on Seminaries. After meeting with faculty and students, the committee gave a strong recommendation to the seminary program.

Mundelein Seminary 
Cardinal Francis George in February 2000 transferred the three archdiocesan programs of ministry formation to Mundelein Seminary:

 Lay Ministry Formation Program
 Diaconate Formation Program
 Instituto de Liderazgo Pastoral (Pastoral Leadership Institute)

The archdiocese transferred the Center for Development in Ministry to the archdiocesan Pastoral Center. Mundelein Seminary now became the center for the formation of priests, deacons and lay people. The USML board of advisors decided to adopt a formal name, the University of Saint Mary of the Lake / Mundelein Seminary. This follows the style of most pontifical universities, which have a formal name and a common name. Also in 2000,  Cardinal George established the Liturgical Institute at USML

In 2007, USML published The Mundelein Psalter.  It is the first complete one-volume edition containing the approved English-language texts of the Liturgy of the Hours, with psalms that are pointed for the chanting of the Divine Office. On September 22, 2012, Sister Sara Butler, a USML professor and a member of the International Theological Commission, became a papally-appointed expert at the 13th Ordinary General Assembly of the Synod of Bishops on the New Evangelization.

Monsignor Dennis J. Lyle was the outgoing rector and president of the seminary and university; he was succeeded on July 1, 2012, by the Reverend Father Robert Barron. Father Thomas A. Baima is the Vice-Rector for Academic Affairs, coordinating the schools and institutes of the university. On December 3, 2012, Elizabeth Nagel was named to succeed Father John G. Lodge as president of the (mostly lay and postgraduate) Pontifical Faculty of Theology.

In 2021, USML celebrated its centennial.  Approximately 116 seminarians from 24 dioceses were enrolled that year, despite the COVID-19 pandemic. In 2022, the University received a grant from the Lilly Endowment to help fund development of a project to integrate new pedagogical methods into formation programs for seminarians, priests and lay leaders.

Campus
USML has a capacity for about 400 students. Its buildings are distinctive for their neo-Georgian architecture, laid out symmetrically. They are centered upon the chapel, dedicated to Mary, mother of Jesus, under the title of her Immaculate Conception — the patroness of the seminary.

Other important buildings on the extensive campus - unique among Catholic seminaries - are separate seminarian and faculty residences, a classroom building, the refectory, the Feehan Memorial Library/McEssy Theological Resource Center, the administration building, a convent, gymnasium, conference and guest facilities, the Cardinal Stritch Retreat House, and a Villa for the Archbishop of Chicago.

The George Cardinal Mundelein Auditorium at USML is home to the historic Gottfried-Wurlitzer theatre pipe organ. The organ was built in 1929 for Chicago radio organist Al Carney.  Cardinal Mundelein acquired the organ in 1935 had it installed in the auditorium by the Kilgen Organ Company. The 1921 Wurlitzer console is original to the Chicago Theatre and was played by organist Jesse Crawford. The organ has been maintained by the Chicago Area Theatre Organ Enthusiasts (CATOE) since 1973.

Archbishop Blase J. Cupich is the chancellor of USML.  The USML sports teams of the university are known as the Lakers.

The Liturgical Institute has its own faculty and is dedicated to training, research and publication in the fields of sacramental theology and liturgy. The institute offers a professional Master of Arts in liturgy, an academic Master of Arts (liturgical studies), and a Licentiate in Sacred Theology. All degrees are awarded by USML.

Notable alumni

 Alfred Leo Abramowicz
 Robert Barron
 Romeo Roy Blanchette
 Edward Braxton
 Maurice Francis Burke
 Edwin R. Chess
 George Clements
 Daniel Coughlin
 William Edward Cousins
 Edward Egan
 Dawn Eden Goldstein
 Dominic Grassi
 Andrew Greeley
 Wilton Daniel Gregory
 Ronald Aldon Hicks
 Reynold Henry Hillenbrand
 Gerald Frederick Kicanas
 Jerome Edward Listecki
 Douglas Martis
 John L. May
 Thomas Joseph Murphy
 Joe Paprocki (D.Min.)
 Thomas J. Paprocki
 Michael Pfleger
 George J. Rassas
 Patrick William Riordan
 Alberto Rojas
 Edward James Slattery
 John George Vlazny
 James S. Wall (Liturgical Institute)

Cemetery and Burials

The cemetery is located across from the Faculty Residence and resting place for 17 sites. Amongst the graves are those of two former Archbishops of Chicago:

Albert Gregory Meyer
George Mundelein

Dioceses served
In addition to the archdiocese of Chicago, the seminary was used by the following dioceses as of the 2020–2021 academic year:

United States

Diocese of Albany
Archdiocese of Atlanta
Diocese of Cheyenne
Diocese of Davenport
Archdiocese of Dubuque
Diocese of El Paso
Diocese of Fairbanks
Diocese of Gaylord
Diocese of Grand Rapids
Diocese of Jefferson City
Diocese of Joliet
Diocese of Lafayette
Diocese of Las Cruces
Diocese of Las Vegas
Diocese of Lubbock
Diocese of Rockford
Diocese of Saginaw
Diocese of San Jose
Archdiocese of Seattle
Diocese of Springfield-Cape Girardeau
Diocese of Tucson
Diocese of Wichita
Diocese of Yakima
Syro-Malabar Catholic Eparchy of St. Thomas of Chicago

Uganda
Archdiocese of Kampala
Diocese of Kiyinda-Mityana

India
Syro-Malabar Catholic Archeparchy of Kottayam

References

External links
 

1921 establishments in Illinois
Buildings and structures in Lake County, Illinois
Catholic seminaries in the United States
Catholic universities and colleges in Illinois
Education in Lake County, Illinois
Educational institutions established in 1921
Libertyville, Illinois
Mundelein, Illinois
Pontifical universities
Roman Catholic Archdiocese of Chicago
Universities and colleges in Chicago